Xiao Longxu (born June 1962) is a Chinese engineer and professor and chief designer at the Research Institute of People's Liberation Army Rocket Force. He is a member of the Communist Party of China.

Biography
Xiao was born in Shouguang, Shandong, in June 1962. He took the National College Entrance Examination after grade ten, and earned the highest marks in his county. In 2001, he was exempted from master's degree studies and directly admitted to Tsinghua University's doctoral program.

Honours and awards
 July 19, 2018 Merit Citation Class III
 November 22, 2019 Member of the Chinese Academy of Engineering (CAE)

References

1962 births
Living people
People from Shouguang
Engineers from Shandong
Tsinghua University alumni
Members of the Chinese Academy of Engineering